Scottish or Scots units of measurement are the weights and measures peculiar to Scotland which were nominally replaced by English units in 1685 but continued to be used in unofficial contexts until at least the late 18th century. The system was based on the ell (length), stone (mass), and boll and firlot (volume). This official system coexisted with local variants, especially for the measurement of land area.

The system is said to have been introduced by David I of Scotland (1124–53), although there are no surviving records until the 15th century when the system was already in normal use. Standard measures and weights were kept in each burgh, and these were periodically compared against one another at "assizes of measures", often during the early years of the reign of a new monarch. Nevertheless, there was considerable local variation in many of the units, and the units of dry measure steadily increased in size from 1400 to 1700.

The Scots units of length were technically replaced by the English system by an Act of the Parliament of Scotland in 1685, and the other units by the Treaty of Union with England in 1706. However, many continued to be used locally during the 18th and 19th centuries. The introduction of the Imperial system by the Weights and Measures Act 1824 saw the end of any formal use in trade and commerce, although some informal use as customary units continued into the 20th century. "Scotch measure" or "Cunningham measure" was brought to parts of Ulster in Ireland by Ulster Scots settlers, and used into the mid-19th century.

Length

 Scottish inch The Scottish inch was 25.44 mm, almost the same as the English (and modern international) inch (25.40 mm). A fraudulent smaller inch of  ell (22.4 mm) is also recorded.
 foot 12 inches (305.3 mm; compare with the English foot of 304.8 mm).
 yard 36 inches (915.9 mm; compare with the English yard of 914.4 mm). Rarely used except with English units, although it appears in an Act of Parliament from 1432: "The king's officer, as is foresaid, shall have a horn, and each one a red wand of three-quarters of a yard at least."
 Scots ell The ell was the basic unit of length, equal to 37 inches (941.3 mm). The "Barony ell" of 42 inches (1069 mm) was used as the basis for land measurement in the Four Towns area near Lochmaben, Dumfriesshire.
 fall 6 ells, or 222 inches (5.648 m).
 Scots mile 320 falls or 5920 feet (1807 metres, compare with the English mile of 5280 English feet or approximately 1609 metres), but varied from place to place. Obsolete by the 19th century.

Area
A number of conflicting systems were used for area, sometimes bearing the same names in different regions, but working on different conversion rates. Because some of the systems were based on what land would produce, rather than the physical area, they are listed in their own section. Please see individual articles for more specific information. Because fertility varied widely, in many areas, production was considered a more practical measure.

Area by size
For information on the squared units, please see the appropriate articles in the length section
square inch
square ell
square fall
Scots rood 
Scots acre

Area by production

Eastern Scotland:

 oxgang  The area an ox could plough in a year (around 20 acres).
 ploughgate  8 oxgangs
 davoch  (or ) 4 ploughgates

Area by taxation/rent 
In western Scotland, including Galloway:
 markland 8 ouncelands (varied) 
 ounceland 20 pennylands
 pennyland basic unit; sub-divided into halfpenny-land and farthing-land.
 quarterland ( Of variable value.
 groatland (Scottish Gaelic)

Volume

Dry volume
Dry volume measures were slightly different for various types of grain, but often bore the same name.

 chalder Normally understood as 16 bolls (being just under 12 Winchester quarters)
 boll (or ) Equal to 4 firlots.
 firlot
 peck
 lippie, or forpet

These volume measurements were fixed at slightly different sizes at different times. A unified weights and measures system is attributed to David I - though the first written records of this are from the 14th century. The Assize of 1426 made changes to these measures. Then the Assize of 1457 was followed by four major revisions. These involved increases in the size of the firlot, the basic unit of grain measure, and occurred in: c.1500, 1555 (modified in 1563), 1587 and 1618. This last date gave a fixed Scottish system which only changed with the introduction of English measures. An increase in the size of the firlot allowed greater taxation to be raised (as each unit collected was bigger).

Superimposed on this chronological complexity was the difference between the "legal" measures established by the assizes, and the actual measures used in the markets and everyday trade. The "trading" measure could be one sixteenth larger than the "legal" boll, and the "customary" boll a further one sixteenth larger.

Weight equivalents of one  boll are given in a trade dictionary of 1863 as follows:
Flour 140 pounds;
Peas or beans 280 pounds;
Oats 264 pounds;
Barley 320 pounds;
Oatmeal 140 pounds.

Fluid volume

Nipperkin was also used, but perhaps not part of this more formal set.

Weight
Weight was measured according to "troy measure" (Lanark) and "tron measure" (Edinburgh), which were standardised in 1661. In the Troy system these often bore the same name as imperial measures.

 drop
 ounce
 pound 
 stone

Various local measures all existed, often using local weighing stones.

See also the weight meanings of the  under the dry volume section, above.

See also
Units of measurement
Systems of measurement
History of measurement
Scottish coinage
Scottish pronunciation
Tron

Bibliography
 Collins Encyclopedia of Scotland
 Weights and Measures, by D. Richard Torrance, SAFHS, Edinburgh, 1996,  (NB book focuses on Scottish weights and measures exclusively)
 
 Scottish National Dictionary and Dictionary of the Older Scottish Tongue
 Weights and Measures in Scotland: A European Perspective R. D. Connor, et al. National Museum of Scotland and Tuckwell Press, NMSE Publishing, 2004,

References

External links
 Scottish Weights and Measures on Scottish Archive network (SCAN)

Scottish

Medieval Scotland
Early Modern Scotland
Systems of units
Units of measurement by country